America Football Club, usually abbreviated to America-RJ or simply America, is a Brazilian football team based in the city of Rio de Janeiro, in the northern neighborhood of Tijuca. The team compete in Campeonato Carioca, the top tier of the Rio de Janeiro state football league.

Founded on 18 September 1904, the club competed in the Campeonato Brasileiro Série A several times, winning the state championship seven times. The club's home stadium is the Estádio Giulite Coutinho, which has a capacity of 16,000. They play in red shirts, white shorts and red socks.

The football anthem composer Lamartine Babo was a supporter of America. America's mascot is a devil. America also sponsors a beach American football team, the America Red Lions.

History
On 18 September 1904, Alberto Koltzbucher, Alfredo Guilherme Koehler, Alfredo Mohrsted, Gustavo Bruno Mohrsted, Henrique Mohrsted, Jayme Faria Machado and Oswaldo Mohrsted founded America Football Club. In 1905, America, together with Bangu, Botafogo, Petrópolis, Fluminense and Futebol Atlético Clube founded Liga de Football do Rio de Janeiro (Rio de Janeiro Football League), which was the first football federation of Rio de Janeiro. In 1913, the club won the state championship for the first time.

For the 1971 season, the club competed in the national Championship's first edition, finishing in 11th place.

The yellow star just above their emblem represents their win in the Tournament of the Champions (Torneio dos Campeões) in 1982, which was a tournament organized by CBF to serve as a preview to the Campeonato Brasileiro Série A tournament. Flamengo declined the invitation so America, the team with the best record after the selected teams, was invited to fill the spot. America won the tournament by beating Guarani in overtime at Maracanã stadium.

In 2006, America was the runner-up of Taça Guanabara. America played the final against Botafogo.

In 2008, America suffered a major blow by being relegated to the Second Division of the Campeonato Carioca. However, they won the Second Division in 2009, thus being promoted to the first level in 2010. However, the club were relegated again in 2011 and continues playing the Second Division in 2015, returns to the elite of the Campeonato Carioca after five years vying for the Serie B, after beating the Americano.

Honors

Other state titles
  Third Stage of the Campeonato Carioca: 1955
  Taça Jayme de Carvalho: 1976
  Rio de Janeiro Extra Tournmanent: 1938 and 1952
  Torneio Relâmpago: 1945
  Taça Eficiência: 1936
  Taça Disciplina: 1947, 1949, 1965, 1969, 1970 and 1983
  Taça Fernando Loretti Jr. de Aspirantes: 1944
  Torneio Ary Barroso (mixed teams): 1965*.

International tournaments
  Imprensa Peruana:
 (1955)
  Quadrangular Sultana Del Valle:
 (1961)
  Quadrangular de Medellín:
 (1961)
  International Soccer League II
 (1962)
  Torneio Internacional Negrão de Lima:
 (1967)
  Taça TAP:
 (1973)
  Torneio Costa Dourada – Terragona:
 (1983)

National tournaments
  Torneio Quadrangular Presidente Costa e Silva: 1
 (1968)
  Torneio Luís Viana Filho: 1
 (1968)

Youth teams
  Campeonato Carioca de 2° Quadro: 6 times (1919, 1923, 1926, 1929, 1930 and 1932)
  Amateur Campeonato Carioca: 2 times (1936 and 1940)
  Campeonato Carioca Carioca de Aspirantes: 1968
  Campeonato Carioca de Juniores: 6 times (1933, 1934, 1935, 1938, 1940 and 1941)
  Campeonato Estadual de Juniores da Série B: (2012)
  Torneio Início de Juniores: 1953
  Campeonato Carioca Carioca de Infanto-Juvenis: 2 times (1969 and 1979)
  Campeonato Carioca Carioca de Infantil: 1981
  Campeonato Carioca Carioca Especial de Infantil (under-15): 2012
  Campeonato Carioca Carioca de Juvenis: 1991
  Copa do Brasil de Juniores runners-up: 2001

 Women's team
  Campeonato Carioca de Futebol Feminino runners-up: 2007

Current squad
According to the CBF register.

Top goalscorers
Luisinho Lemos : 311
Edu : 212
Maneco : 187
Plácido: 167
Carola : 158
Chiquinho : 102

Highest attendances
America 1–4 Flamengo, 147.661(139,599 people seated), April 4, 1956
America 0–2 Fluminense, 141,689 (120,178 people seated), June 9, 1968
America 1–2 Vasco, 121,765 (104,775 people seated), January 28, 1951
America 1–0 Flamengo, 104,532, April 25, 1976
America 5–1 Flamengo, 102,002 (94,516 people seated), April 1, 1956
America 2–1 Bonsucesso, 101.363, July 25, 1973
America 2–0 Fluminense, 100,635 (92,516 people seated), March 17, 1956
America 2–1 Fluminense, 98,099, December 18, 1960
America 1–0 Fluminense, 97,681, September 22, 1974
America 0–1 Fluminense, 96,035, April 27, 1975
America 4–2 Benfica (POR), 94,642 (87,686 people seated), July 3, 1955
America 1–1 Flamengo, 93,393, May 19, 1969

Mascot
One controversial aspect of the club is the official mascot: the Diabo (devil), depicted as a red demon complete with horns, pointy beard, curled moustache, a long fat arrow-pointed tail, hooved feet and a black cape. The club's old stadium was nicknamed Caldeirão do Diabo ("Devil's Cauldron"). In 2006 some of the club's fans, supported by then-manager Jorginho who is an Evangelical Christian, attempted to replace the diabo with a bald eagle, claiming that the devil was "unlucky". However, as the "diabo" is a traditional part of the club's story and with the original mascot the club conquered its greatest achievements and there was no change in the club's fortunes with the new mascot, the replacement was abandoned and it was considered that Jorginho's opinion was motivated by "religious fanaticism".

Clubs named after America
America is the Brazilian club with the largest number of other clubs named after it. It has homonyms in Natal, São José do Rio Preto, Três Rios, Manaus, Teófilo Otoni and Fortaleza.

References

External links
Official Site
History, news and fans
Full information on Matches when America won titles
Best attendances in matches of America (RJ)

Association football clubs established in 1904
Football clubs in Rio de Janeiro (state)
Football clubs in Rio de Janeiro (city)
 
1904 establishments in Brazil